Stegenus dactylon is a species of beetle in the family Cerambycidae, and the only species in the genus Stegenus. It was described by Pascoe in 1857.

References

Lamiini
Beetles described in 1857